The 1946 UCLA Bruins football team was an American football team that represented the University of California, Los Angeles during the 1946 college football season.  In their second year under head coach Bert LaBrucherie, the Bruins compiled a 10–1 record (7–0 conference) and finished in first place in the Pacific Coast Conference. After completing the regular season with an undefeated record, they lost to Illinois in the 1947 Rose Bowl.

The Bruins ranked fourth nationally in total offense, averaging 377.9 yards per game. They also ranked fifth nationally in rushing defense with an average 259.8 yards per game.

Ten UCLA players were selected by the Associated Press (AP) or United Press (UP) on the 1946 All-Pacific Coast football team: quarterback Ernie Case (AP-1, UP-1); end Burr Baldwin (AP-1, UP-1); tackle Don Malmberg (AP-1, UP-1); center/linebacker Don Paul (AP-1, UP-1); backs Jerry Shipkey (AP-2, UP-3), Cal Rossi (AP-3, UP-2), and Ernie Johnson (AP-3); tackle Bill Chambers (AP-2, UP-2); guard Mike Dimitro (AP-2, UP-3); and end Tom Fears (AP-3, UP-2).

Schedule

After the season

The 1947 NFL Draft was held on December 16, 1946. The following Bruins were selected.

References

UCLA
UCLA Bruins football seasons
Pac-12 Conference football champion seasons
UCLA Bruins football
UCLA Bruins football